Bingil Bay is a coastal town, locality and bay in the Cassowary Coast Region, Queensland, Australia. In the  the locality of Bingil Bay had a population of 427 people.

Geography

The locality of Bingil Bay is bounded to the east by the bay of the same name with Ninney Point on the north-east coast. A long sandy beach extends south from Ninney Point along the coastline. The town is in the south-eastern corner of the locality.

The land use is a mixture of residential, growing tropical fruit), and grazing on native vegetation.

History

The name Bingil is believed to be an Aboriginal word meaning a good camping ground given to the area by Frederick Cutten, a pioneer settler in the area.

In 1884, the Cutten brothers (Frederick, Leonard, Sydney and James) established the first commercial tea plantation in Australia on their Bicton estate at Bingil Bay, also growing coffee, mangoes, bananas, pineapples and other tropical fruit. At that time, Bingil Bay was only accessible by boat. Most of the Bicton estate was destroyed by a cyclone in 1918 and although the homestead was rebuilt the remainder of the estate was never restored. The descendants of the original tea plants were rediscovered in the rain-forest by Dr Alan Maruff in 1958 and seedlings from these plants formed the basis for the Nerada Tea plantations.

The area was formerly known as Clump Point (the name of a nearby headland) until 1929 when a post office called Bingal Bay was established.

On 9 July 1936, the road from El Arish to Bingil Bay was finally completed, reducing the travel time to 30 minutes. It was officially opened by Percy Pease, the Member of the Queensland Legislative Assembly for Herbert.

The Bingil Bay Lifesaving Club opened in 1936.

Around 1966, then Prime Minister of Australia, Harold Holt and his wife Zara Holt, owned a holiday cottage they called "The Shack" at Bingil Bay. It sat high on the hill with views as far as Dunk Island. The couple were keen spearfishers. The cottage did not have a telephone.

In the 2011 census, Bingil Bay had a population of 369 people.

In the  the locality of Bingil Bay had a population of 427 people.

Heritage listings 

Bingil Bay has the following heritage sites:
 405 Alexander Drive and Esplanade: Ninney Rise
 Holt Court: Cutten Brothers' Graves

Education
There are no schools in Bingil Bay. The nearest government primary schools are Mission Beach State School in Wongaling Beach to the south and El Arish State School in El Arish to the west. The nearest government secondary school is Tully State High School in Tully to the south-west.

Amenities

Bingil Bay Cafe has meals and basic groceries. It is at 39 Bingil Bay Road.

References

Further reading

 

  — available online

External links

 
 
 

Towns in Queensland
Cassowary Coast Region
Coastline of Queensland
Localities in Queensland
Cassowary Coast Local Heritage Places